Frederick, Frederic or Fred Price may refer to:

 Freddy Price (1888–1960), English footballer
 Frederick George Hilton Price (1842–1909), English banker and antiquarian
 Frederick K. C. Price (1932–2021), founder and pastor of Crenshaw Christian Center, California
 Frederic Price (cricketer, born 1840) (1840–1894), English cricketer
 Frederic Price (cricketer, born 1852) (1852–1937), English clergyman and cricketer
 Fred Price (cricketer) (1902–1969), English cricketer
 Sir Frederick Price (civil servant) (1839–?), Indian civil servant
 Fred Price (footballer) (1901–1985), English footballer
 R. Fred Price, California politician
 Frederick William Price (1873–1957), British cardiologist and medical author